Martín Muñoz de las Posadas is a municipality located in the province of Segovia, Castile and León, Spain. According to the 2004 census (INE), the municipality has a population of 439 inhabitants.

References

External links
 Community website

Municipalities in the Province of Segovia